This is a list of marketing promotions by McDonald's restaurants.

Slogans
Here is a partial list of slogans:

Arab world
 استمتع بالفرق (Enjoy the difference) (pre-2003)
 انا احبه (I'm lovin' it) (2003–present)
 تعرف جودة مأكولاتنا (Check our food quality) (2006–present)

Argentina
 Ese momento para gran sabor de McDonald's ("It's a good time for the great taste of McDonald's") (1988)
 Esto es valor. Esto es McDonald's ("This is value. This is McDonald's") (1995–1999)
 Siempre un buen momento (Every time a good time) (1999–2003)
 Me Encanta (I'm lovin' it) (2003–present)

Australia
 You Deserve a Break Today (1971–1975)
 We got it all for you (1975–1980)
 You deserve a Break Today (1980–1984)
 Love a Burger, Love a McDonald's (1981)
 It's a Good Time for the Great Taste (1984–1988)
 McDonald's is cooking ... breakfast! (1987–1991)
 The Good Time, Great Taste of McDonald's (1988–1991)
 It's MacTime (1992)
 It's MacTime Now (1991)
 It's MacTime Again (1994)
 MacTime Rocks On (1994, featured David Essex's song "Rock On")
 Only McDonald's (1998)
 Mac your Day (2000–2003)
 Big McDonald's (2001)

 Feed your inner child (2005)
 Hand in hand with Australia (2006–present)
 Bacon bacon bacon (2007, bacon menu)
 It's a Little Bit Fancy. (used for the "M Selections" line of products, 2009–present)
 It all comes together at Macca's. (2012–present)

Austria
 McDonald's ist einfach gut
 Everytime a good time (1999–2003)
 I'm lovin' it (2003–present)
 Ich liebe es (2003–present)

The Bahamas
 We love to see you smile (2000–2003)
 I'm lovin' it (2003–present)

Brazil
 É um bom momento para o delicioso sabor do McDonald's (It's a good time for the great taste of McDonald's) (1984–1994)
 Esse é o momento que gostoso que é McDonald's (1987–1994)
 Gostoso como a vida deve ser (Tasty like life should be) (1994–2003)
 Amo Muito Tudo Isso (I'm lovin' it) (2003–present)

Bulgaria
 "Ресторант за цялото семейство" (The restaurant for whole family)  (1994–1999)
 "Усмивка в твоя ден" (Every time a good time)  (1999–2003)
 "I'm lovin' it" (2003–present)

Canada
 Ha Ha Ha, McDonald's (1967-2001)

English
 McDonald's is your kind of place (1967–1971)
 You deserve a break today (1971–1975)
 McDonald's Sure is Good to Have Around (1974, concurrent with 1971 slogan)
 We do it all for you (also known as You, you're the one) (1975–1979)
 Nobody can do it like McDonald's can (1979–1981)
 Nobody can say good night like McDonald's can (1979)
 You deserve a break today/There's so much fun for you today (1981–1983)
 Nobody makes your day like McDonald's can (1980–1983)
 McDonald's and you (1983–1984)
 It's a good time for the great taste of McDonald's (1984–1988)
 It's Mac Tonight (1985, Mac Tonight advertising)
 The good time, great taste of McDonald's (1988–1990)
 Food, folks and fun (1990–1991)
 Good food, good value (1991)
 McDonald's Today (1991–1992)
 What you want is what you get (1992–1997)
 Have you had your break today? (1995–1997)
 My McDonald's (1997)
 Did somebody say McDonald's? (1997–2000)
 We love to see you smile (2000–2001)
 Put a Smile On (2001)
 There's a little McDonald's in everyone (2001–2003)
 I'm lovin' it (2003–present)
 It's what I eat and what I do (2005, combined with 2003 slogan to make It's what I eat and what I do...I'm lovin' it)
 What we're made of (2008–2015)

French
 Vous méritez une pause aujourd'hui (You deserve a break today) (1972–1975)
 Nous faisons tout pour vous (We do it all for you) (1975–1979)
 Personne ne peut le faire comme McDonald's (Nobody does it like McDonald's) (1979–1981)
 Vous méritez une pause aujourd'hui (You deserve a break today)/Il ya tellement de plaisir pour vous aujourd'hui (There's so much fun for you today) (1981–1983)
 Moi J'm McDonald (Me I love McDonald's) (1982–2003)
 Pour vos p'tits bouts de sous (For your little bits of money) (2000)
 C'est ça que j'm (It's that which I love) (2003–)
Venez comme vous etes  (2018)

Chile
 Un Momento Especial, Cada Dia (A special moment, every day) (1999–2003)
 Me Encanta Todo Eso (All that I love) (2003–2012)
 Me Encanta (I'm lovin' it) (2003–2012, secondary)
 I'm lovin' it (2013–present)

China
 我就喜歡 (I'm lovin' it) (2003–present)

Czech Republic
 Restaurace pro celou rodinu (Restaurant for the whole family) (1992–1999)
 Každý den, skvělý den (Every time a good time) (1999–2003)
 I'm lovin' it (2003–present)

El Salvador
 Me Encanta (I'm lovin' it) (2003–present)
 ¡McDonald's Está Chivisimo! (McDonald's is Cool!) (2009)                                               
  Que bueno que Viniste (2014)

Finland
 Uskomatonta. Mutta totta. (pre-2003)
 I'm lovin' it (2003–present)

France
 Ca se passe comme ca chez McDonald's (It happens like that at McDonald's) (1985–2003)
 C'est Tout Ce Que J'aime (That's all I Like/I'm lovin' it) (2003–present)
 Venez comme vous êtes (Come as You Are) (2008–present)

Georgia
 აი, რა მიყვარს (I'm lovin' it) (2012-present)
 რესტორანი მთელი ოჯახისთვის (Restaurant for the whole family) (2015–present)

Germany
 Das etwas andere Restaurant (The somewhat different restaurant) (1971–1977)
 Essen mit Spaß (Eating with fun) (1978–1982)
 Gut, dass es McDonald's gibt (It's good that McDonald's exists) (1982–1987)
 Der Platz, wo Du gern bist, weil man gut isst (The place where you like to be because you eat well) (1987–1991)
 McDonald's ist einfach gut (McDonald's is simply good) (1991–1999)
 Every time a good time (1999–2003)
 Ich liebe es (I'm lovin' it) (2003–present)

Guatemala
 Esse momento para gran sabor de McDonald's (1984–1995)
 El sabor de la alegría (The Taste of Joy) (1995–2003)
 Me encanta (I'm lovin' it) (2003–present)

Honduras
 Esta en tu sonrisa (pre-2003)
 Me encanta (I'm lovin' it) (2003–present)

Hong Kong
 Nobody can do it like McDonald's can (1979–1984)
 You deserve a break today (1981–1984)
 Good Times and Great Tastes (1984–1985)
 It's a good time for the great taste of McDonald's (1984–1988)
 Good time, great taste (that's why this is our place) (1988–1993)
 Only McDonald's (1993–1995)
 Every time a good time (1999–2003)
 I'm lovin' it (2003–present)
 You are the sunshine of my life (2011–2014)
 #LittleBigMoments (2018-2019)
 FeelingGood (2019-2021)

Hungary
 McDonald's azért, mert jó (McDonald's because it's good) (1990s-1999)
 Ahol jó lenni, ahol jó enni (Where it's good to be, where it's good to eat) (1996–1999)
 Elérhetőbb, mint valaha (More accessible than ever) (1998–1999)
 Minden alkalom jó alkalom (Every time a good time) (1999–2003)
 I'm lovin' it (2003–present)

Iceland
 I'm lovin' it (2003–2009)

India
 McDonald's mein hai kuch baat. (October 13, 1996 – 1999)
 Every time a good time (1999–2003)
 I'm lovin' it (2003–present)

Indonesia
 Good Time, Great Taste (1991–1998)
 Saat santai, rasa lezat di McDonald's (Relaxing time, delicious taste at McDonald's) (1991–1998)
 Manalagi selain di McD (Where else but McDonald's?) (1998–2003; February 2016 – 25th anniversary of McDonald's Indonesia; November 2019–present)
 I'm lovin' it (2003–present)
 Ini McD Kita (This is our McDonald's) (February 2021–2022 – 30th anniversary of McDonald's Indonesia)
 Ada McD, Ada Kita (There's McDonald's, there's us, 2022–present)

Israel
 I'm lovin' it (2003–present)

Italy
 Sorridi di gusto con McDonald's(1985-1990s)
 Succede solo da McDonald's (1990s–1999)
 Every time a good time (1999–2003)
 I'm lovin' it (2003–present)

Jamaica
 I'm lovin' it (2003–2005)

Japan
 味なことやる! マクドナルド! (The taste that does it... McDonald's!) (1973–1978)
 世界のことば! マクドナルド! (The world's word... McDonald's!) (1978–1985)
 おいしい笑顔! マクドナルド! (A delicious smile from... McDonald's!) (1985–1989)
 だから, マクドナルド! (Because... McDonald's!) (1989–1995)
 いい顔いっぱい、バリューがいっぱい。 (Full of goodness, full of value) (1995–1998)
 みんなはマクドナルドを愛して (Everyone loves McDonald's) (1998–2003)
 I'm lovin' it (2003–present)

Malaysia
 It's a good time for the great taste of McDonald's (1984–1988)
 Masa riang, rasa hebat (1984–2001)
 The good time, great taste of McDonald's (1988–2001)
 Segalanya untukmu (Everything for you) (1995–2002)
 Makan di McD (2002–2003)
 I'm lovin' it (2003–present)
 Sama-Sama (2015–present)

Mexico
 No son tacos, pero está bastante bueno. (It's not tacos, but it's pretty good.) (1967-1995)
 ¡Mas valor por su dinero! (1995)
 Qué gusto verte sonreír (We love to see you smile) (2000–2003)
 Me encanta (I'm lovin' it) (2003–present)

New Zealand
 We've got it all (June 7, 1976 – 1980)
 You deserve a Break Today (1980–1984)
 Love a Burger, Love a McDonald's (1981)
 It's a Good Time for the Great Taste (1984–1988)
 The good time, great taste of McDonald's (1988–1992)
 Grab the Moment (early 1990s)
 It's gonna be a lovely day (1994–2000, breakfast weekdays)
 It's gonna be a great weekend (1994–2000, breakfast weekends)
 It's Mac Time (late 1990s)
 That's our tucker (1990s & 2005)
 Every time a good time (2000 – October 3, 2003)
 I'm lovin' it (October 4, 2003 – present)
 Proud to be part of the change (2006–2009)
 It's a Little Bit Fancy. (2009, used for the "M Selections" line of products)
 More than you expect (2011)
 Just because (2011–present)

Netherlands
 "U verdient een pauze vandaag." ("You deserve a break today.") (1971–1981)
 "McDonald's maakt meer van lekker uit eten." ("McDonald's makes more of eating out.")
 "Ze zei meneer tegen me." ("She called me Sir!")
 "Je mag hier met je handjes eten" ("You can eat with your hands here")
 "McDonald's is altijd goed" ("McDonald's is always good") (early 1990s)
 "Welkom" ("Welcome") (mid 1990s)
 "Gek op Mac" ("Crazy about Mac")
 "Every time a good time" (2000–2003)
 "I'm lovin' it" (2003–present)
 "Vinden we leuk" ("We like it") (2012)
 "Voor iedereen" ("For all") (2014–present)

Norway
 Spis den beste maten! (Eat the best food!) (1999–2003)
 Må få min smak! (Must get my taste!) (2003–2003)
 I'm lovin' it (2003–present)
 Hvis Du Vil (If You Want) (2004, Greek Salad commercials)

Panama
 Me encanta (I'm lovin' it) (2003–2012)
 I'm lovin' it (2013–present)

Paraguay
 Me encanta! (I'm lovin' it) (2003–present)

Peru
 Nos encanta verle sonrie. (pre-2003)
 Me encanta (I'm lovin' it) (2003–2012)
 I'm lovin' it (2013–present)

Philippines
 It's A Good Time for the Great Taste. (1984–1988)
 The Good Time, Great Taste of McDonald's. (1988–1994)
 Ang Sarap ulitin! (So delicious repeating it!) (1994–1999)
 Kita Kits sa McDo (See you at McDo) (1999 – October 2003)
 Love ko 'to (I'm lovin' it) (October 2003–present)
 Hooray for Today! (2011–2016)

Poland
 Restauracja inna niż wszystkie (The restaurant is below the rest) (1992–1999)
 W McDonald's spotkajmy się (Let's meet at McDonald's) (1992–1999)
 Każdy dzień to Twój dzień (Every Time A Good Time) (1999–2003) 
 I'm lovin' it (2003–present)
 Mam smaka na Maka (I have a taste for McDonald's) (2015–present)

Portugal
 Momentos mais saborosos (Delicious moments) (1996 – September 2003)
 Só pode ser McDonald's (2001–2003)
 I'm lovin' it (October 2003 – April 2017)
 Gosto tanto (I'm lovin' it) (April 2017 – present)

Puerto Rico
 Vamos pa McDonald's. (1990s)
 i'm lovin' it (2003–present)

Romania
 Restaurantul întregii familii (Restaurant for the whole family) (1995-1999)
 Te simți bine oricând (Every time a good time) (1999-2003)
 I'm lovin' it (2003–present)

Russia
 Весело и вкусно в McDonald's (The good time, great taste of McDonald's) (1990–1999)
 Здесь хорошо всегда (Every time a good time) (1999–2003)
 Bот что я люблю (2003–2022)
 I'm lovin' it (2003–2022, secondary)

Slovakia
 Reštaurácia pre celú rodinu (Restaurant for the whole family) (1995–1999)
 Každý deň, skvelý deň (Every time a good time) (1999–2003)
 i'm lovin' it (2003–present)

Slovenia
 Every time a good time (1999–2003)
 i'm lovin' it (2003–present)

South Africa
 Make every day a McDonald's day (1995–2003)
 i'm lovin' it (2003–present)

Spain
 Lo que me importa eres tú (What matters to me is you) (1982)
 El sitio que te gusto (The place that you like) (1984)
 Sabemos lo que te gusta (We know what you like) (1998–2003)
 I'm lovin' it (2003–present)

Sweden
 It's a Good Time for the Great Taste (1984)
 The Good Time, Great Taste of McDonald's (1988)
 Kom till McDonald's–vi ger mer (1993) (Come to McDonald's–We give more)
 Livet har sina goda stunder (1996) (Life has its good moments)
 Every Time a Good Time (1999 – July 2003)
 Gotta Get My Taste (July 2003 – 2003)
 i'm lovin' it (2003–present, meals)
 Stora nog att göra skillnad (2018-present, sustainability work, Ronald McDonald Hus) (Big enough to make a difference) 

Taiwan
 麥當勞簡直是不錯的 (McDonald's is simply good) (1990s–1999)
 每一次的好時機 (Every time a good time) (1999–2003)
 I'm lovin' it (2003–present)

Trinidad and Tobago
 i'm lovin' it (2003, 2011–present)

Turkey
 McDonald's Gibisi Yok! (1994–2003, 2006-present)
 İşte Bunu Seviyorum (2003–present)

United Kingdom
 You'll enjoy the difference (1974-1980)
 There's a difference at McDonald's You'll Enjoy (1974–1986)
 At McDonald's we've got time for you (1985–1988)
 A Visit To McDonald's Makes Your Day (1988–1992)
 There's nothing quite like a McDonald's (1992–1997)
 Enjoy more (1997–2001)
 Only McDonald's (2001–2003)
 Things that make you go MMMMMM! (2002–2003)
 i'm lovin' it (2003–present)
 It's What I eat and what I do Good food, fast. (2005)
 The Sign of a Good Burger (2006)
 Make Up Your Own Mind (2006)
 Oh! Burger (2007)
 Some fun, some food, it's all inside this Happy Meal. (2007–present, used for Happy Meal campaigns.)
 Some fun, some food and one of your five a day! (2009–present, originally known as "Some fun, some food and one of your five a day, at McDonald's!" used for Happy Meal's five a day fruit/vegetables campaigns.)
 That's what makes McDonald's (2008–present)
 That's McDonald's...and then some (2009–present) (this phrase was voted #2 most irritating piece of British advertising likely to deter custom after the Moonpig.com cards jingle in an independent March 9 survey by RM)
 That's McDonald's...but cozy (Used for the Winter Menu in 2009)
 That's McDonald's...with Yee-Hah! (Used for the Tastes of America series in 2009)
 That's McDonald's...but Summery (Summer 2009)
 That's McDonald's...but Merrier (Used for the Festive Menu in 2009)
 There's a McDonald's for everyone (2009–2014)
 Good Times (2014–present)
 Fancy a McDonald's? (2021–present)

Ukraine
 Ресторан для всієї родини (Restaurant for the whole family) (1997–1999)
 Кожен раз гарний час (Every time a good time) (1999–2003)
 Я це люблю (I'm lovin' it) (2003–present)

Uruguay
 Valor delicioso. (Delicious value.) (1991–2003)
 Me Encanta! (I love it!) (2003 – December 31, 2012)
 I'm lovin' it (January 1, 2013–present)

United States
English
 Let's eat out! (1960–1965)
 Look for the Golden Arches! (1960–1967)
 Go for the Goodness at McDonald's (1962–1969)
 The closest thing to home (1966–1969)
 McDonald's is your kind of place (1967 – January 22, 1971)
 You deserve a break today (1971–1975)
 Enjoy the best food at McDonald's (1973, concurrent with 1971 slogan)
 McDonald's Sure is Good to Have Around (1974, concurrent with 1971 slogan)
 We do it all for you (also known as You, you're the one) (1975–1979)
 Nobody can do it like McDonald's can (1979–1981)
 Nobody can say good night like McDonald's can (1979)
 You deserve a break today/There's so much fun for you today (August 21, 1981–January 1983)
 Nobody makes your day like McDonald's can (1980 – August 21, 1981)
 That's My McDonald's (1981, concurrent with 1980 slogans)
 We cook it all for you at McDonald's (1982, concurrent with 1980 slogans)
 McDonald's and you (October 1982– April 16, 1984)
 It's a good time for the great taste of McDonald's (April 16, 1984 – April 10, 1988, this slogan was used on newspapers from April 16, 1984, until March 6, 1990, and in November 1993)
 30 years of good times and great taste (1985, 30th anniversary)
 It's Mac Tonight (1985, Mac Tonight advertising)
 McDonald's is your place to be (1986, also used by NBC between 1990 and 1992 as NBC is the place to be)
 The good time, great taste of McDonald's (1988–1990)
 You Deserve A Break Today (1989–1991, concurrent with 1988 slogan)
 Food, folks and fun (February 1990, March 7, 1990 – March 18, 1991)
 McDonald's Today (1991–1992)
 What you want is what you get (1992–1995)
 What you want is what you get at RocDonald's today (1994, The Flintstones promotion)
 McDonald's, where what you want is what you get (1994, Sonic the Hedgehog promotion)
 What you want is what you get, delivered from McDonald's today (1994, McDelivery trial)
 Do you believe in magic? (March 17, 1992 – October 15, 1997, Ronald McDonald and Happy Meal McDonald's ads)
 Ronald Makes it Magic (February 17, 1995 – October 15, 1997, Ronald McDonald and Happy Meal McDonald's ads)
 Have you had your break today? (1995–1997)
 One Two Three Four... Big Mac burger! (1997)
 My McDonald's (February 19 – October 1, 1997)
 Did somebody say McDonald's? (1997–2000)
 We love to see you smile (2000–2003)
 Put a Smile On (2001–2003)
 Smile (2001–2003)
 (ba, da, ba, ba, ba) I'm lovin' it (2003–present)
 It's what I eat and what I do (2005, combined with 2003 slogan to make It's what I eat and what I do...I'm lovin' it)
 What we're made of (2008–2015)
 Gimme Back that Filet-O-Fish (2009–2015, Filet-O-Fish advertising)
 You want it, need it, you gotta have a taste of McDonald's burgers (December 1, 2010 – 2013, Big Mac, Quarter Pounder, Angus Burger advertising)
 The simple joy of McDonald's (2010–2013)
 A whole new way to love McDonald's (2013–2015)
 There's something for everyone to love at McDonald's (2013–2015)
 Choose Lovin (2015–2018)

Spanish
 Este es el momento del gran sabor en McDonald's (April 16, 1984 – April 10, 1988)
 Como se antoja McDonald's? (1995–1997)
 Mi McDonald's (1997)
 Alguien dijo McDonald's? (1997–2000)
 Que gusto verte sonreir (2000–2003)
 Sonrie (2003)
 Me encanta (2003–Present)

Jingles
Perhaps the best-known jingle was "You deserve a break today" a song sometimes incorrectly attributed to a young Barry Manilow, (who did sing it in one version of the commercial and thus included it in his "Very Strange Medley" of product theme songs, with others he had written) was in fact, written by jingle singer/songwriter Kenny Karen. The melody was either used in, or originates from, a song called "We're Together", credited on The Brass Ring S/T album as being composed by A. Ham/K. Gavin/N. Kipner/S. Woloshin. In the accompanying TV commercial, there was almost no mention of food. Instead, the ad featured an all-male McDonald's cleaning crew, singing after-hours about their individual tasks, and emphasizing that "at McDonald's it's clean!" just before launching into the almost operatic chorus: "You deserve a break today / So get up and get away / To McDonald's!"

Another well known jingle was the "McDonald's is your kind of place / It's such a happy place / Hap, hap, hap, happy place..." from 1967, sung to the tune of "Down by the Riverside".

Big Mac

English (1974–)

Portuguese (1987–)

Russian (1990–2022)

"McDonald's and You!" (1983–1984)

"It's a good time for the great taste" (1984–1988)

There is also a full version used in one commercial.

Good Time, Great Taste (1988–1990)

There is also a full version sung by Ronald McDonald, some kids, and the McDonaldland gang in one commercial.

A Visit to McDonald's Makes Your Day (UK, 1988–1991)

Food, Folks and Fun (1990–1991)

There is also a full version used in one commercial.

McDonald's Today (1991–1992)

What you want is what you get (1992–1994)

There was also an extended version used in one commercial which goes like this:

There was also a full version used in 25 years of The best of McDonald's on TV'' VHS which goes like this:

Have you had your break today? (1995–1997)

Have you had your break today? (Big Mac/Canadian version, 1995–1997)
There was also a Canadian version that also promoted the Big Mac.

Livet har sina goda stunder
This campaign was used in Sweden in 1996 and was recorded by Swedish band Ultima Thule.

Every time a good time
This campaign was used in Germany in 1999 and was originally recorded by Billy White and Patricia Darcy Jones. The campaign was also used in the Netherlands, New Zealand, Poland, Sweden, Taiwan, the Czech Republic, Hungary and Hong Kong. "Every time a good time" song was written by: David Buskin, Janet Fox, Susan Hamilton and published by TUTTAPANNA MUSIC.

I'm lovin' it (2003–present)

There are also two full versions sung by Justin Timberlake. The first one was used in one commercial.

The second one was used in one commercial.

McDonald's menu song
The McDonald's $1,000,000 Menu Song was an instant-win promotion created as part of an advertising campaign, which ran from 1988 to early 1989. As the name suggests, the song, which was based on Reunion's 1974 hit single "Life Is a Rock (But the Radio Rolled Me)", incorporates all of the items (at that time) on the McDonald's menu: sandwiches, other lunch/dinner items, breakfast items, dessert items, and drinks, in that order.

Promotion overview
Either flexi-discs or cardboard records containing the song were attached to advertising inserts and distributed within newspapers across the United States. On all but one of the issued recordings, the singers were not able to recite the song perfectly from start to finish; when the singers made a mistake, the record was over. On the unique, prize-winning recording, the singers were able to complete the song; this record was a $1,000,000 instant winner.

Approximately 80 million records were distributed, and only one of them was a winner. The promotion was won by Galax, Virginia, resident Charlene Price, who used the money to purchase the convenience store where she worked.

United States
In the United States, the lyrics read as follows:

Canada
In Canada, the lyrics were as follows:

Hong Kong
In Hong Kong, the lyrics were as follows:

Québec
Around the same time (1989–90), a French version of the ad campaign was produced for Quebec; however, no promotion was attached.

The order given in this version was sandwiches, other lunch/dinner items, dessert items, drinks, and breakfast. The Québec lyrics were as follows:

Media tie-ins

The following movies and TV shows were made into Happy Meals and other promotional products:
4Kids Entertainment
 Yu-Gi-Oh! (2002)
 Sonic X (2003)
 Yu-Gi-Oh! GX (2007)

20th Century Studios
 The Pagemaster (1994)
 Mighty Morphin Power Rangers: The Movie (1995)
 Turbo: A Power Rangers Movie (1997)
 Dr. Dolittle (1998)
 Casper Meets Wendy (1998)
 Night at the Museum: Battle of the Smithsonian (2009)
 Ice Age: Dawn of the Dinosaurs (2009)
 Avatar (December 4–31, 2009)
 Alvin and the Chipmunks: The Squeakquel (January 1 – February 4, 2010)
 Star Wars (2010)
 Rio (2011)
 Alvin and the Chipmunks: Chipwrecked (2011)
 Star Wars Episode I: The Phantom Menace 3D (2012)
 Ice Age: Continental Drift (2012)
 Epic (2013)
 The Book of Life (2014)
 The Peanuts Movie (2015)
 Ice Age: Collision Course (2016, international markets only)
 Ron's Gone Wrong (2021)

Aardman Animation
 Flushed Away (2006)
 The Pirates! In an Adventure with Scientists! (2012) (U.K. only)
 Shaun the Sheep Movie (2015) (U.K. only)
 Chicken Run: Dawn of the Nugget (2023) 

Activision
 Skylanders (2013, 2014, 2015, 2016)

American Greetings
 Strawberry Shortcake (2009, 2010, 2011)

Aplaplac
 31 Minutos (2023) (Latin America only)

Bagdasarian Productions
 Alvin and the Chipmunks (1989)
 Alvin and the Chipmunks: The Squeakquel (January 1 – February 4, 2010)
 Alvin and the Chipmunks: Chipwrecked (2011)

Dimension Films
 Tom and Jerry: The Movie (1992)
 Spy Kids (2001)
 Spy Kids 2: Island of Lost Dreams (2002)
 Pinocchio (2002)
 Spy Kids 3-D: Game Over (2003)
 The Adventures of Sharkboy and Lavagirl in 3-D (2005)

DreamWorks Animation
 Antz (1998)
 Shrek the Third (2007)
 Bee Movie (2007)
 Kung Fu Panda (2008)
 Madagascar: Escape 2 Africa (2008)
 Hotel for Dogs (2009)
 Monsters vs. Aliens (2009)
 The Penguins of Madagascar (2010, 2014)
 How to Train Your Dragon (2010)
 Shrek Forever After (2010)
 Kung Fu Panda 2 (2011)
 Megamind (2010)
 Puss in Boots (2011)
 Madagascar 3: Europe's Most Wanted (2012)
 Rise of the Guardians (2012)
 The Croods (2013)
 Mr. Peabody & Sherman (2014)
 How to Train Your Dragon 2 (2014)
 Home (2015)
 Trolls (2016)
 Trolls World Tour (2020)

Fox Kids/Jetix
 Bobby's World (1994)
 Digimon (2001, only in the U.K.)
 The Magic School Bus (1994)
 Ninja Turtles: The Next Mutation (1997)
 NASCAR Racers (1999)
 Power Rangers (1993, 1997, 2003, 2005)
 Power Rangers: Lightspeed Rescue (2000)
 Totally Spies (2005)
 W.I.T.C.H. (2005)

Hasbro
 Transformers (1995, 2004, 2006, 2008, 2009, 2010, 2018)
 Beast Wars (1996)
 Beast Machines (1999)
 Transformers Animated (2008)
 Transformers Prime (2013)
 Littlest Pet Shop (2009, 2010)
 My Little Pony (2005, 2009, 2011, 2014, 2015, 2017–2018, 2023)
 Hasbro Gaming (2021)
 Power Rangers (2023)

Lego Group
 Bionicle Chronicles (2003)
 Bionicle Legends (2007)

Lucasfilm
 Star Wars: The Clone Wars (2008, 2010, 2011)
 Star Wars: The Rise of Skywalker (2019)

Marvel Studios
 Spider-Man (1994, 2009)
 Marvel Heroes (2010)
 Avengers: Endgame (2019)
 Eternals (2021)
 Thor: Love and Thunder (2022)
 Black Panther: Wakanda Forever (2022)
 Guardians of the Galaxy Vol. 3 (2023)

Mattel
 Barbie in A Mermaid Tale (2010)
 Barbie in The Pink Shoes (2013)
 Richard Scarry (1995)
 Hot Wheels Battle Force 5 (2010, 2011)
 Monster High (2013, 2015) (Latin America only)

MGA Entertainment
 Rainbow High (2023)

Necco
 Sweethearts (2015)

Nickelodeon
 Game Gadgets (1992)
 Tak and the Power of Juju (2003)
 Tak: The Great Juju Challenge (2005)
 El Tigre: The Adventures of Manny Rivera (2008)
 iCarly (2010, 2011)
 SpongeBob SquarePants (2012)
 Victorious (2012)	
 Power Rangers Samurai (2011)
 Power Rangers Super Samurai (2012)
 Teenage Mutant Ninja Turtles (2012, 2013, 2015 and 2016)
 Power Rangers Megaforce (2013)
 Winx Club (2013)

Nintendo
 Super Mario Bros: The Movie (1993)
 Super Mario Bros. 3 (1990)
 Pokémon Black and White (2011, 2012)
 Pokémon (2014, 2015, 2021)
 Mario Kart 8 (2014, 2022)

Paramount Pictures and Nickelodeon Movies
 Star Trek: The Motion Picture (1979)
 Peanuts (1989)
 Hotel for Dogs (2009)
 The Last Airbender (2010)
 The Spiderwick Chronicles (2008)
 The SpongeBob Movie: Sponge Out of Water (2015)
 The SpongeBob Movie: Sponge on the Run (2020)
 Sonic the Hedgehog 2 (2022)
 Teenage Mutant Ninja Turtles: Mutant Mayhem (2023)

Paws Inc.
 Garfield (1984, 1988, December 1991, 1998)

Sanrio
 Hello Kitty (2004, 2009, 2010, 2011, 2013, 2015, 2018)

Schneider's Bakery
 iCarly (2010, 2011)

Sega
 Sonic the Hedgehog (1994, 2003, 2004)
 Sonic Heroes (2004)
 Sonic Prime (2023)

Sony Pictures Entertainment
 The Adventures of Elmo in Grouchland (1999)
 Hook (1991)
 The Real Ghostbusters (1987, 1992)
 Mac and Me (1988)
 Santa Claus: The Movie (1985)
 Surf's Up (2007)
 The Smurfs (2011)
 Hotel Transylvania (2012)
 The Smurfs 2  (2013)
 The Amazing Spider-Man 2  (2014)
 Hotel Transylvania 2 (2015)
 The Angry Birds Movie (2016)
 Smurfs: The Lost Village (2017)
 The Emoji Movie (2017)
 Peter Rabbit (film) (2018)
 Hotel Transylvania 3: Summer Vacation (2018)
 Spider-Man: Into the Spider-Verse (2018)

Summit Entertainment
 Astro Boy (2009)

Televisa
 El Chavo Animado (2006, 2008, 2010, 2011, 2014) (Latin America only)

Time Warner/Turner Broadcasting System
 Cartoon Network (2007)

Cartoon Network Studios
 Ben 10: Ultimate Alien (2011)
 Adventure Time (2014)
 The Powerpuff Girls (2016)
 We Baby Bears (2023)

Universal
 E.T. the Extra-Terrestrial (1982)
 An American Tail (1986)
 Babe (1995)
 Back to the Future: The Animated Series (1992)
 Jurassic Park (1993)
 The Flintstones (1994)
 Despicable Me 2 (2013)
 Minions (2015)
 The Secret Life of Pets (2016)
 Sing (2016)
 Despicable Me 3 (2017)
 The Secret Life of Pets 2 (2019, international markets only)
 Minions: The Rise of Gru (2022)
 Sing 2 (2021)
 The Super Mario Bros. Movie (2022)

Walt Disney Studios and Jim Henson Productions
 101 Dalmatians (1991)
 101 Dalmatians (1996)
 102 Dalmatians (2000)
 Aladdin (1993 (Europe) 2004 (U.S. and Europe)
 Aladdin and the King of Thieves (1996)
 An Extremely Goofy Movie (2000)
 Armageddon (1998)
 Avengers: Endgame (2019)
 A Bug's Life (1998)
 Atlantis: The Lost Empire (2001)
 Bambi (1988)
 Beauty and the Beast (2002)
 Brother Bear (2003)
 Cars (2006)
 Cars on the Road (2022)
 Chip 'n Dale Rescue Rangers (1989)
 The Chronicles of Narnia: The Lion, the Witch and the Wardrobe with Walden Media (2005)
 Chicken Little (2005)
 Cinderella (1987)
 The Country Bears (2002)
 Dave the Barbarian (2004)
 Descendants (2023)
 Dick Tracy (1990)
 Disney's House of Mouse (2001)
 Disney and Pixar's Pals (2005)
 Disney Princess (2008)
 Dinosaur (2000)
 DuckTales (1988)
 DuckTales the Movie: Treasure of the Lost Lamp (1990)
 ESPN (2004)
 The Emperor's New Groove (2000)
 Elemental (2023)
 Encanto (2021)
 Finding Nemo (2003, 2005)
 Fraggle Rock (1987–1988)
 Frozen II (2019)
 The Great Muppet Caper (1981)
 Hercules (1997)
 The Haunted Mansion (2003)
 Honey, I Shrunk the Kids (1989)
 The Hunchback of Notre Dame (1997)
 Inspector Gadget (1999)
 Inspector Gadget 2 (2003)
 Incredibles 2 (2018)
 Jim Henson's Muppet Babies (1986–1988)
 The Jungle Book (1990, 1997)
 The Jungle Book 2 (2003)
 Lilo & Stitch (2002, 2004, 2022)
 The Incredibles (2004)
 The Lion King (1994) (international markets only)
 The Lion King (2019)
 The Lion King II: Simba's Pride (1998)
 The Lion King 1½ (2004)
 The Little Mermaid (1989, 1997, 2006)
 The Little Mermaid (2023)
 Lizzie McGuire (2004)
 Lightyear (2022)
 Luca (2021)
 The Many Adventures of Winnie the Pooh (2002)
 Mighty Ducks the Movie: The First Face-Off (1997)
 Mission to Mars (2000)
 Monsters, Inc. (2001)
 Mulan (1998)
 Muppet Treasure Island (1996)
 Oliver & Company (1988)
 Onward (2020)
 Pirates of the Caribbean: The Curse of the Black Pearl (2003)
 Pirates of the Caribbean: Dead Man's Chest (2006)
 Pirates of the Caribbean franchise (2008)
 Ralph Breaks the Internet (2018)
 Raya and the Last Dragon (2021)
 The Rescuers Down Under (1990)
 Return to Never Land (2002)
 Rudyard Kipling's The Jungle Book (1994)
 Snow White and the Seven Dwarfs (1993, 2001)
 Sleeping Beauty (1997)
 Soul (2020)
 Talespin (1990)
 Tarzan (1999)
 That's So Raven (2005)
 The Muppet Show (2002–2003; Europe and Australia)
 The Tigger Movie (2000)
 The Wild (2006)
 Treasure Planet (2002)
 Toy Story (international markets only)
 Toy Story 2 (1999)
 Toy Story 4 (2019) (international markets only)
 Walt Disney Classics (1987)
 Walt Disney Masterpiece Collection (1996–1997)
(1996):
Snow White – Snow White and the Seven Dwarfs
Scat Cat – The Aristocats
Merlin – The Sword in the Stone
Pocahontas – Pocahontas
Cinderella – Cinderella
Robin Hood – Robin Hood
Aladdin – The Return of Jafar
Alice – Alice in Wonderland
(1997):
Donald Duck – The Three Caballeros
Simba – The Lion King
Tigger – The Many Adventures of Winnie the Pooh
Aurora – Sleeping Beauty
Dodger – Oliver and Company
Bambi – Bambi
Eliott – Pete's Dragon
Woody – Toy Story
 Who Framed Roger Rabbit (1988)
 Zootopia+ (2023)

Warner Bros.
 Batman: The Animated Series (1993, 1996)
 Batman Returns (1992, cancelled due to the movie's dark content)
 Batman Forever (1995)
 Batman: The Brave and the Bold (2010)
 Batman Unlimited (2015)
 Batman (2013)
 Barbie (2023)
 DC League of Super-Pets (2022)
 The Flintstones: On the Rocks (2001)
 Free Willy (1993)
 Free Willy 2: The Adventure Home (1995)
 Free Willy 3: The Rescue (1997)
 Green Lantern (2012)
 Journey to the Center of the Earth 3-D (2008)
 Quest for Camelot (1998)
 Scooby-Doo (1989)
 Space Jam (1996)
 Space Jam: A New Legacy (2021)
 Speed Racer (2008)
 Star Wars: The Clone Wars (2008)
 Super Looney Tunes (1991)
 The Lego Movie (2014)
 The Lego Movie 2: The Second Part (2019)
 The Lego Batman Movie (2017)
 The Witches (1990)
 Teen Titans Go! (2017, 2019, 2022)
 The Lego Ninjago Movie (2017)

Pathe
 The Magic Roundabout (2005) (film)

Zazzle
 iZ (2006)

Misc.
 Bakugan Battle Brawlers: New Vestroia (2009)
 Bakugan: Gundalian Invaders (2010)
 Beyblade Burst (2020)
 Kidz Bop (2009)
 Spyro: A Hero's Tail (2005)
 The Wizard of Oz (2013)
 Flutterbye (2014)
 Spy Gear (2008, 2012, 2014)
 Monster Jam (2015)
 Little Monsters (2002) (U.K. only)
 Johnny Test (2011) (U.K. only)
 Pikmi Pops (2020)
 Shopkins (2016)
 The Beano (2000) (U.K. only)
 Teenie Beanies

Scratch-off games and sweepstakes promotions

United States
 1972–Munich Olympics scratch-off game; this differed from later ones in that if the U.S. won more than one medal in an event, the player could win multiple prizes (e.g., a sweep won a Big Mac, fries, and a drink)
 1976–Montreal Olympics scratch-off game.
 1982–Taste the thrill of Atari at McDonald's.
 1984–Los Angeles Olympics scratch-off game.
 1987–present (annually)–Monopoly Game collect-and-win sweepstakes
 1988–Seoul Olympics scratch-off game. Customers received a card for an Olympic event. If the U.S. won gold in that event, you won a Big Mac. If the U.S. won silver, you won a medium fries. If the U.S. won bronze, you won a small drink.
 1989–Scrabble promotion
 1989–Million-Dollar McDonald's song contest for the Big Mac.
 1991–Dick Tracy scratch-off game.
 1996–2000, 2004, 2009, 2014–Teenie Beanies (Teenie Boos in 2014)
 1999–Disney's Inspector Gadget Code Name Game
 2001–Who Wants to Be a Millionaire scratch-off game. Players would scratch off what they thought was the correct answer on their game card, and could log onto ABC.com for a special 50:50 lifeline to narrow their choices down.
 2006–FIFA World Cup 2006 Meal
 2006–Pirates of the Caribbean Sweepstakes
 2013-Xbox One
 2014–FIFA World Cup 2014 Peel. Play. Olé Olé Sweepstakes

Notes

References

 
Food- and drink-related lists